Fixation may refer to:

 Carbon fixation, a biochemical process, usually driven by photosynthesis, whereby carbon dioxide is converted into organic compounds
 Fixation (alchemy), a process in the alchemical magnum opus
 Fixation (histology) in biochemistry, histology, cell biology and pathology, the technique of preserving a specimen for microscopic study
 Fixation (population genetics), the state when every individual in a population has the same allele at a particular locus
 Fixation (psychology), the state in which an individual becomes obsessed with an attachment to another human, an animal, or an inanimate object
 Fixation (surgical), an operative technique in orthopedics
 Fixation (visual) maintaining the gaze in a constant direction
 Fixation agent, a process chemical
 Fixation in Canadian copyright law, a concept in Canadian copyright law
 Nitrogen fixation, a process by which nitrogen is converted from its inert molecular form to a compound more readily available and useful to living organisms
 Session fixation, computer security attack
 Target fixation, attentional phenomenon
 “Fixation”, an episode of The Good Doctor

See also
 Fix (disambiguation)